Al Wong (born 1939) is an American artist and educator, known for his experimental film and mixed media installation art. He is based in San Francisco, California.

Biography 
Al Wong was born in 1939 in San Francisco, California to father Willie Wong. He attended San Francisco Academy of Art University from 1960 until 1962 and the San Francisco Art Institute (SFAI), from 1962 until 1968 and again in 1970 until 1971. He received a Masters of Fine Arts degree in 1972 from SFAI. He also studied with Shunryu Suzuki Roshi at the San Francisco Zen Center.

He taught classes at San Francisco Art Institute from 1975 until 2003, as well working as a lecturer at California State University, Sacramento from 1975 until 1977; and as an associate professor at Sonoma State University.

Wong started making films around 1965, with his first film screening in 1967 at the Expo 67 in Montreal, Canada. Wong's work was included in the, Other Sources: An American Essay (1976) multidisciplinary, multiethnic exhibition curated by Carlos Villa. In addition to filmmaking and film installation art, Wong also has created works on paper, light installations and photo installations.

Wong was awarded the Guggenheim Fellowship in Film (1986), and the Flintridge Foundation grant (1998).

Filmography

References 

1939 births
San Francisco Art Institute alumni
San Francisco Art Institute faculty
California State University, Sacramento faculty
Sonoma State University faculty
American experimental filmmakers
Mixed-media artists
20th-century American artists
Living people
Artists from San Francisco